William F. Henley Buck was an American professional baseball player and umpire.

Early life
Buck was the son of John M. and Mary B. and had a sister. His university preparation was at St. Timothy's Hall in Catonsville, Maryland, and his undergrad study was at Princeton University, where he graduated in 1870. He then did post-graduate study in medicine for two years at the University of Maryland. He was a Presbyterian and did not marry.

At Princeton
He was a member of the Princeton University's Nassau Baseball Club first nine (starting lineup) in the 1866–67 season as a shortstop.  The team was also known as the Pickwick Nine, playing under that name because the faculty refused to allow them to leave campus for some games. In 1867–68 he played at third base, left field, and second base. The team became known as the Princeton University Baseball Club in 1868–69. That year he remained listed as third baseman for the first nine, again occasionally playing at second. In 1869–70 he was made captain and played center field, but also played shortstop, second base, and even catcher. Buck graduated in 1870, and in 1871 moved back to his home of Baltimore. He continued to be involved in amateur baseball. In May, 1871 he was the umpire of a game between Harvard and Brown.

Career

In Baltimore, he joined the local team, the Baltimore Pastime Club, playing in games against the Philadelphia Athletic Club, and the Olympics of Washington, DC. In October 1871, he played in a game which was arranged to as a benefit to support victims of the Great Chicago Fire. He also played for the Baltimore Marylands and Baltimore Enterprise clubs.

Death
Buck died June 10, 1890 in Boston, Massachusetts and was buried in Greenmount Cemetery in Baltimore.

References 

Presbrey, Frank, and James Hugh Moffatt, eds. Athletics at Princeton: A History. Frank Presbrey Company, 1901. accessed November 10, 2016 at https://archive.org/details/athleticsatprin00presgoog
Twenty Years After, Class of '70, Princeton College: Record of the Members, Issue 3; Issues 1870–1890, Sherman & Company, 1891. p10-11. accessed November 10, 2016 at https://books.google.com/books?id=0H8aAAAAYAAJ&lpg=PA10&ots=poxG6KBMmU&dq=1870%20princeton%20baltimore%20buck&pg=PA11#v=onepage&q&f=false

Year of birth missing
1890 deaths
Princeton University alumni
Major League Baseball umpires
19th-century baseball umpires
Baseball players from Baltimore